Teresa Berger (born 1956) is a German scholar of liturgical studies and Catholic theology.  She is the Thomas E. Golden Jr. Professor in Catholic Theology as well as a professor of liturgical studies at Yale Divinity School and the Yale Institute of Sacred Music.

Career 
Berger was born in Germany in 1956.  After studying in Mainz and Nottingham, she earned a doctorate in theology in 1984 at the Ruprecht-Karls-Universität, in Heidelberg. In 1989 she received an additional doctorate in liturgical studies from Westfälische Wilhelms-Universität in Munster, Germany, and in 1991 her habilitation.  

After completing her studies in Heidelberg, Berger came to Duke Divinity School for a year of study. The following year, 1987, she joined the faculty at Duke Divinity School as associate professor of ecumenical theology.  

Berger began teaching at Yale Divinity School in 2007. In April 2015, she was appointed the Thomas E. Golden Jr. Professor in Catholic Theology. This is the first endowed chair of Catholic Theology in Yale Divinity School's history, and Berger was the first faculty member appointed to the professorship. She is also a professor of Liturgical Studies, and teaches in Yale's Institute of Sacred Music.

In addition to teaching at Duke and Yale, she has also been a visiting professor at the Universities of Mainz, Münster, Berlin and Uppsala.

Liturgical studies 
Berger's writing is informed by gender and cultural studies and, most recently, the theory of digital media.  She has written on feminist liturgy, gender and liturgical history, liturgy and creation, and the migration of liturgical practices to the digital social space.  

Among other titles, Berger edited Dissident Daughters: Feminist Liturgies in Global Context, published in 2001, which examined "woman-identified" liturgies, and the women activists and communities that have created them.  In 2007, Berger co-produced a video documentary about women's liturgies entitled Worship in Women's Hands.

See also 

 Feminism
 Feminist theology

External link

References

 Living people
 1956 births
 German academics
 German women academics
 Yale Divinity School faculty
University of Münster alumni